Kemal Yamak (1924, in Merzifon – 26 July 2009) was Commander of the Turkish Army (1987–1989). He was previously head of the Special Warfare Department (1971–1974).

At the request of Yamak, General Semih Sancar, then the Chief of General Staff, asked Bülent Ecevit for a slush fund of 1 million dollars to support the Counter-Guerrilla programme. It was at that point Ecevit learned of its existence, and demanded a briefing.

In 2006, he published a book defending the role of the Special Warfare Department, and rejecting many allegations about its links with the "deep state".

Books
 Gölgede kalan izler ve gölgeleşen bizler, Doğan Kitap, 2006

References 

1924 births
2009 deaths
People from Merzifon
Turkish Army generals
Commanders of the Turkish Land Forces
Special Warfare Department personnel